Oro is a Peruvian brand of soft drink owned by the Ajegroup and sold in Perú, Ecuador and Venezuela. Oro is a rival product to Inca Kola sharing the same characteristics such as the yellow color. Oro is sold in PET bottles of 525 ml.

See also
 Inca Kola - direct competitive brand
 Isaac Kola - direct competitive brand
 List of soft drinks by country
 Triple Kola - direct competitive brand
 Viva - direct competitive brand

References

External links
  Official website of the Ajegroup

Peruvian drinks
Ajegroup brands